Ernest William Johnson Jr. (November 19, 1921 – December 9, 1985) was an American football coach. He served as the head football coach at Clarion University of Pennsylvania from 1957 to 1962, compiling a record of 23–23–3.

References

External links
 

1921 births
1985 deaths
Clarion Golden Eagles football coaches
High school football coaches in Pennsylvania
People from Elk County, Pennsylvania
Players of American football from Pennsylvania